Bid Parsi (also Romanized as Bīd Pārsī; also known as Ḩabībābād) is a village in Miyan Khaf Rural District, in the Central District of Khaf County, Razavi Khorasan Province, Iran. At the 2006 census, its population was 282, in 62 families.

References 

Populated places in Khaf County